Derepazarı District is a district of the Rize Province of Turkey. Its seat is the town of Derepazarı. Its area is 28 km2, and its population is 7,057 (2021).

Composition
There is one municipality in Derepazarı District:
 Derepazarı

There are 10 villages in Derepazarı District:

 Bahattinpaşa
 Bürücek
 Çakmakçılar
 Çeşmeköy
 Çukurlu
 Esentepe
 Kirazdağı
 Maltepe
 Sandıktaş
 Uzunkaya

References

Districts of Rize Province